The People's Democratic Party closure case refers to a legal procedure during which the Peoples' Democratic Party (HDP) is threatened with closure while hundreds of its politicians facing a political ban for five years. The HDP was accused to have organizational ties with the Kurdistan Workers' Party (PKK).

Background 
In the past, several pro Kurdish parties have been banned, and pro-Kurdish politicians often face legal prosecution and prison terms. The Ministry of the Interior has dismissed dozens of elected HDP mayors since the Municipal Elections held in March 2019, while more than hundred politicians are threatened with life sentences due to the Kobane protests which supported the Kurdish population in Kobanî during the Siege of Kobanî led by the Islamic State (IS). The HDP was accused of being a terrorist organization by several representatives of the Turkish Government and its closure was demanded by the MHP leader Devlet Bahçeli. Bahçeli insinuated that if a closure case was not initiated by the state prosecutor, the MHP itself would demand its closure over the Turkish Party Law. The Turkish President Recep Tayyip Erdoğan as well called the party leaders terrorists. MP Meral Danış Bestaş stated that the judiciary would be able to close down the Party, but the movement of the party would not be able to be closed. The party co-chair, Mithat Sancar, stated that the movement would just regroup in another party as they have done so in the past when pro-Kurdish parties were closed. The same day as the lawsuit against the HDP was filed, a HDP MP Ömer Faruk Gergerlioglu was stripped of his parliamentary immunity. For the closure of the party a majority of two thirds of the judges of the Constitutional Court would have to rule accordingly.

Indictment 
The Court of Cassations initiated an investigation into the HDP regarding an eventual indictment since the 2 March 2021. On the 17 March 2021, the State Prosecutor to the Court of Cassation Bekir Şahin filed a lawsuit before the Constitutional Court demanding the closure of the HDP. The indictment included accusations of organizational ties with the PKK and to work against the unity of the state. The membership of the legally existing Democratic Society Congress (DTK) was deemed enough evidence for a membership in a criminal organization. The indictment also called for a five-year ban for 687 HDP politicians to be involved in political activities, amongst them all party chairs since its existence. Zühtü Arslan, the president of the Constitutional Court instated a rapporteur responsible to verify if the indictment ahead of an examination of the courts judges. But upon the rapporteurs request, the Constitutional Court returned the indictment to the State Prosecutor of the Court of Cassation on the 31 March, alleging procedural deficiencies which should be rectified. On the 7 June 2021, the state prosecutor provided the Constitutional Court with an adapted indictment of 850 pages, confirming his demand for a closure of the party, while lowering the demand a political ban for 451 politicians, which was accepted by the court on the 21 June 2021.

Defense 
In November 2021, the HDP presented their defense to the Constitutional Court together with the ruling of the European Court of Human Rights (ECHR) on the closure case of the Democratic Society Party (DTP) in which Turkey was convicted and ordered to pay a remuneration. The defense team condemned the fact that investigations are used as evidence for a political ban of 451 HDP politicians by the prosecution and maintained the view that for what the party is mainly accused of, are their efforts for the solution of the Kurdish Turkish conflict during the peace process between 2013 and 2015. The right for peace is guaranteed by several international conventions and efforts in a peace building process should not become a subject matter for the closure case.

Reactions

International 
The closure of one of the largest parties in Turkey has been seen as undemocratic and authoritarian by several western political observers. The case has largely been closed since March 2021, the events are widely viewed in the context of Erdogan's poor grip on power notably in the Kurdish majority regions of Turkey. The United States Department of State opposed the eventual closure of the HDP, as it would be contrary to democratic rights and undermine the voters will of a large part of Turkey’s population. Germany and Nacho Sanchez Amor, the EU rapporteur on Turkey also criticized the indictment. On the 8 July 2021, the European Parliament condemned the attempts to close the party by the Turkish Judiciary, alleging that the party has been oppressed since a long time with hundreds of HDP offices attacked in the years 2015–2016, has around 4000 members imprisoned including the former party co-chair Selahattin Demirtaş who despite favorable ruling for his release by the European Court of Human Rights was not allowed to leave the prison.

Domestic 
The communication director to the Turkish President Fahrettin Altun defended the indictment and alleged the organizational ties between the HDP and the PKK and that the PKK is a designated terrorist organization by several countries. Devlet Bahçeli criticized the return of the indictment to the Court of Cassation, requesting a closure of the Constitutional Court while also demanding the state prosecutor to rectify the deficiencies in order enable to closure of the HDP. Politicians of the HDP alleged that the party can not just be shut down, the party is not only a party, but also an idea which would endure an eventual closure of the party. Making reference to the revelations about government corruption by crime boss Sedat Peker, the HDP accused the AKP of wanting to "update its power" with the closure case. The same day as the Constitutional Court accepted the second indictment, HDP co-chair Mithat Sancar lamented that the court accepted it despite the attack on the HDP headquarters in Izmir in which Deniz Poyraz was murdered and accused the MHP and the AKP to have campaigned for months for their closure stating "They made statements on various platforms, portraying the HDP as an enemy".

See also 

 2008 Justice and Development Party closure trial

References 

Peoples' Democratic Party (Turkey)
2021 in Turkey
Trials in Turkey